Ballads of the Book is a collaborative studio album, released on 5 March 2007, on Chemikal Underground. The project was curated by Idlewild lead vocalist Roddy Woomble, and features collaborations between Scottish musicians and Scottish writers. The album is considered a "joint effort" by all those involved. Ballads of the Book was produced at Chem19 studios by Paul Savage and Andy Miller.

Artwork
The album's front cover was designed by Scottish author/artist Alasdair Gray, and painted by Richard Todd. The cover states that it is "for Edwin Morgan."

The album's liner notes include each of the poems in full.

Track listing
 "Song For Irena" – Mike Heron & John Burnside
 "Steam Comes Off Our House" – De Rosa & Michel Faber
 "A Calvinist Narrowly Avoids Pleasure" – James Yorkston & Bill Duncan
 "Dreamcatcher" – Foxface & Rody Gorman
 "A Sentimental Song" – Lord Cut-Glass & Alasdair Gray
 "The Sixth Stone" – Aidan Moffat & Ian Rankin
 "Girl" – Norman Blake & John Burnside
 "The Good Years" – Karine Polwart & Edwin Morgan
 "The War on Love Song" – Sons and Daughters & A. L. Kennedy
 "The Leaving" – Alasdair Roberts & Robin Robertson
 "Message in a Bottle" – Strike the Colours & Rody Gorman
 "If You Love Me You'd Destroy Me" – Aereogramme & Hal Duncan
 "The Rebel on His Own Tonight" – Malcolm Middleton & Alan Bissett
 "Half An Apple" – Trashcan Sinatras & Ali Smith
 "The Fire" – Vashti Bunyan & Rodge Glass
 "Where And When" – King Creosote & Laura Hird
 "Jesus on the Cross" – Emma Pollock & Louise Welsh
 "The Weight of Years" – Idlewild & Edwin Morgan

External links
Ballads of the Book minisite from Chemikal Underground

References

2007 albums
Chemikal Underground albums
Folk albums by Scottish artists
Folk rock albums by British artists